The term British nation may refer to:

 The United Kingdom, a sovereign country in north-western Europe
 British people, the citizens of the United Kingdom of Great Britain and Northern Ireland, the British Overseas Territories, and the Crown dependencies.

Disambiguation pages